Flaglia (stylized in all caps) is a Japanese mixed-media project created by Madoka Takadono. A musical titled Flaglia The Musical: Yukite Kaerishi Monogatari ran from February 3–9 at the Nippon Seinenkan hall in Tokyo. A six-episode anime television series by Gaina titled Flaglia: Natsuyasumi no Monogatari aired in January 2023.

Characters
Yuku

Adel

Tagi

Ren

Mel

Kanchi

Tetsu

Silver

Rabu

Nitta

Mythril

Hasshu

Marie

Jango

Iko

Media

Musical
A musical, titled  and taking place in a Middle Ages-like historical setting, ran from February 3–9 at the Nippon Seinenkan hall in Tokyo. The musical is directed by Tsuneyasu Tomoyoshi.

Anime
An anime series produced by Gaina, taking place in the present day, was announced alongside the musical on October 25, 2022. The anime, titled , is directed by Itsuro Kawasaki and written by Madoka Takadono. Original character designs are provided by Jiwataneho, while Eriko Itō adapts the designs for animation. The six-episode television series aired from January 17 to 31, 2023, on Tokyo MX. The anime's theme song "Here is" and the insert songs "Take Me Back" and "Talk About Us" are performed by The Boyz.

References

External links
 Project official Twitter 
 

2023 anime television series debuts
Mass media franchises
Tokyo MX original programming